Year 182 (CLXXXII) was a common year starting on Monday (link will display the full calendar) of the Julian calendar. At the time, it was known as the Year of the Consulship of Sura and Rufus (or, less frequently, year 935 Ab urbe condita). The denomination 182 for this year has been used since the early medieval period, when the Anno Domini calendar era became the prevalent method in Europe for naming years.

Events 
 By place 
 Roman Empire 
 Emperor Commodus escapes death at the hands of assassins, who have attacked him at the instigation of his sister Lucilla and a large group of senators. He puts many distinguished Romans to death on charges of being implicated in the conspiracy; Lucilla is exiled to Capri.

Births 
 July 5 – Sun Quan, Chinese emperor of the Eastern Wu state (d. 252)
 Zhu Ran, Chinese general of the Eastern Wu state (d. 249)

Deaths 

 Lucilla, Roman empress and daughter of Marcus Aurelius
 Marcus Ummidius Quadratus, Roman politician (b. 138)
 Saoterus, Bithynian Greek freedman and chamberlain
 Ummidia Cornificia Faustina, Roman noblewoman (b. 141)

References